{{DISPLAYTITLE:C9H8}}
The molecular formula C9H8 (molar mass: 126.24 g/mol, exact mass: 126.1409 u) may refer to:

 Indene
 Isoindene

Molecular formulas